Anning District is one of 5 districts of the prefecture-level city of Lanzhou, the capital of Gansu Province, Northwest China. It forms part of the urban core of Lanzhou. The district was established in 1953 and is named after a former Ming dynasty fort. It is known for having numerous peach orchards, since the Ming dynasty it has thus been nicknamed the '10-li peach county' .

Administrative divisions
Anning District is divided to 8 subdistricts.
Subdistricts

Education
The district is the home of several educational institutes:
 Northwest Normal University
 Lanzhou Jiaotong University
 Gansu Agricultural University
 Gansu College of Political Science and Law
 Lanzhou City College
 Gansu Provincial Party School
 Gansu Academy of Agricultural Sciences
 Gansu Academy of Social Sciences

The Lanzhou Botanical Garden is also located in the district.

References

See also
 List of administrative divisions of Gansu

Anning District
Geography of Lanzhou